Folake Olunloyo-Oshinowo is a Nigerian politician and former member of the House of Representatives.

Career
Olunloyo-Oshinowo was educated at St Anne's Grammar school and the International School in Ibadan before attending Obafemi Awolowo University. She graduated in 1990. She was a senior aide to the former Speaker of the House, Alhaji Aminu Waziri Tambuwal, before switching from the Peoples' Democratic Party (PDP) to the All Progressive Congress (APC).

Olunloyo-Oshinowo holds the chieftain title of Aare Egbe Omo Iyalode; she is married to Dr. Tunde Oshinowo.

In 2011 she was elected to the House of Representatives, along with Suleiman Oba Nimota, Maimunat Adaji, Martha Bodunrin, Betty Okogua-Apiafi, Rose Oko and Nkoyo Toyo.

References 

Living people
Nigerian politicians
Nigerian women in politics
Year of birth missing (living people)